is a railway station in the city of Nishio, Aichi, Japan, operated by Meitetsu.

Lines

Station layout
The station has one side platform serving a single bi-directional track. The station has automated ticket machines, Manaca automated turnstiles and is unattended.

Adjacent stations

Station history
Hekikai Electric Railway merged with the Meitetsu Group on May 1, 1944. It was renamed to its present name on December 1, 1949. The station has been unattended since February 1967.

Passenger statistics
In fiscal 2017, the station was used by an average of 1641 passengers daily (boarding passengers only).

Surrounding area
Nishio High School

See also
 List of Railway Stations in Japan

References

External links

 Official web page 

Railway stations in Japan opened in 1928
Railway stations in Aichi Prefecture
Stations of Nagoya Railroad
Nishio, Aichi